The Dr. James Rosenfeld House is a house located in southwest Portland, Oregon listed on the National Register of Historic Places.

See also
 National Register of Historic Places listings in Southwest Portland, Oregon

References

Houses on the National Register of Historic Places in Portland, Oregon
Houses completed in 1929
1929 establishments in Oregon
Joseph Jacobberger buildings
Portland Historic Landmarks
Southwest Hills, Portland, Oregon